"The Bungy" is the second major single by the Japanese band Nico Touches the Walls released on June 4, 2008, from their debut album Who Are You?.

Chart position
The single reached number 42 on the Oricon Chart in Japan.

Music video
The music video for "The Bungy" was released on June 4, 2008, and shows the band playing instruments in a room while there are some dancers around them.

References
Review Single The Bungy. Retrieved September 7, 2011
Nico Tocuhes the Walls The Bungy (PV). Retrieved September 7, 2011

External links
 Nico Touches the Walls official page

2008 singles
Nico Touches the Walls songs
2008 songs
Ki/oon Music singles
Song articles with missing songwriters